John Williams (died 1 January 1751) was a Member of Parliament for Fowey within Cornwall, England, in January 1701 and December 1701.

He was the eldest son of William Williams of Bodenick and Treworgy.

He was appointed High Sheriff of Cornwall for 1703–04.

He never married.

References

Sources
 

Year of birth unknown
1751 deaths
Members of the pre-1707 English Parliament for constituencies in Cornwall
High Sheriffs of Cornwall
English MPs 1701
English MPs 1701–1702